Margaret Kemble Gage (1734–1824) was the wife of General Thomas Gage, who led the British Army in Massachusetts in the American Revolutionary War.  She was born in New Brunswick, Province of New Jersey and lived in East Brunswick Township. She died in England in 1824.

Family life and descendants
Margaret Kemble was the daughter of Peter Kemble, a wealthy New Jersey businessman and politician, and Gertrude Bayard; the granddaughter of Judge Samuel Bayard (b. 1669) and Margaretta Van Cortlandt (b. 1674); and the great-granddaughter of Mayor of New York City Stephanus Van Cortlandt and Gertrude Schuyler.

She married Thomas Gage on December 8, 1758, at her father's 1200-acre Mount Kemble Plantation in New Jersey (where years later generals William Smallwood and Anthony Wayne were quartered in his modest wood-framed mansion, while the Continental Army encamped at Jockey Hollow during the brutal winter of 1779–80).

Following the outbreak of the American Revolution, Margaret Kemble Gage sailed from Boston to England in the summer of 1776 on a ship carrying military widows, orphans, and 170 soldiers who were badly wounded in the Battle of Bunker Hill. She was joined by her husband a few months later, who was recalled after the failure of his attempts to resolve divisions with the colonists either by reconciliation or military action. Together with their children, the couple settled in a Portland Place address in London.

Margaret outlived Thomas Gage by 36 years. The couple had eleven children, and their first son, the future 3rd Viscount Gage, was born in 1761. Gage's daughter, Charlotte Margaret Gage, married Admiral Sir Charles Ogle. 

Descendants of Kemble Gage include:
 Lieutenant General Sir John Paul Foley (1939) retired British general 
 Henry Hodgetts-Foley (1828–1894) former member of Parliament
 Montagu Bertie, 6th Earl of Abingdon (1808–1884) British peer and politician
 John Vereker, 6th Viscount Gort (1886–1946) British military officer and commander of the British Expeditionary Forces in Europe during World War II up to the Battle of Dunkirk.
 Gabriella Wilde (1989–) British model and actress

Her brother, Stephen Kemble, was a lieutenant-colonel in the British Army during the Revolution.

She was portrayed by Emily Berrington in the television miniseries Sons of Liberty.

Role in American Revolution

Some historians feel that Margaret Kemble Gage may have been instrumental in causing the first shots to be fired in the American Revolution (the Battle of Lexington and Concord).

In the days leading up to the battle, the Sons of Liberty saw that the British troops in Boston were preparing for something. Dr. Joseph Warren, one of the key leaders of the Sons of Liberty, had a confidential informer, who was well-connected to the British high command. The secret informant provided "intelligence of their whole design...to arrest Samuel Adams and John Hancock, who were known to be at Lexington, and burn the colonists' military stores at Concord."

Thomas Gage had wanted to prevent a war. He had planned a secret night march, hoping to move Adams and Hancock elsewhere, as well as the colonial powder and cannon, while the colonists slept.

Instead, Warren, after learning of the plan, dispatched Paul Revere and William Dawes, who set off a chain reaction of alarm riders across Massachusetts and to adjoining colonies. Instead of a quiet night mission, the British troops opposed by thousands of wide-awake, angry, armed colonists.

By the end of the day, the British troops were under heavy fire by irate patriots. Gage later sent an additional 1,000 units, with cannons, which allowed the British force to make it back to Boston.

The informant for Warren is still unknown as it was only two months later that he was killed during the Battle of Bunker Hill.

The evidence is slim and circumstantial, but some historians feel that the leading suspect is Margaret Kemble Gage.  She was an American, and came from a highly prestigious and wealthy family.  Her social standing was equal to that of her husband. General Gage's officers were even known to call her "Duchess".  She did not make a secret of her divided loyalties and said that "she hoped her husband would never be the instrument of sacrificing the lives of her countrymen".

General Gage stated that he had only told two people of the plan, which was to be kept a "profound secret": his second-in-command, and one other person.  Some of the other top British officers suspected that that other person was General Gage's wife.

Prior to this, General Gage was a devouted husband, but after the unexpected engagements at Lexington and Concord, she was put on a ship back to England.

See also
Intelligence in the American Revolutionary War
Intelligence operations in the American Revolutionary War

References

Sources
 
 
 

Women in the American Revolution
People of colonial New Jersey
People from East Brunswick, New Jersey
People from New Brunswick, New Jersey
People of New Jersey in the American Revolution
Schuyler family
1734 births
1824 deaths
American people of Dutch descent
Huguenot participants in the American Revolution
American spies during the American Revolution